Thomas Kempshall (January 14, 1865) was a U.S. Representative from New York.

Born in England around 1796, Kempshall attended the common schools. He immigrated to the United States with his father, who settled in Pittsford, New York, in 1806. He moved to Rochester, New York, in 1813, where he was employed as a carpenter. He engaged in mercantile pursuits and later became engaged in milling.

He served as member of the board of aldermen of Rochester, New York in 1834 and again in 1844, serving as mayor in 1837. He was an unsuccessful candidate for mayor in 1852.

Kempshall was elected as a Whig to the Twenty-sixth Congress (March 4, 1839 – March 3, 1841).

He died in Rochester, New York, January 14, 1865, aged about 69 years. He was interred in Mount Hope Cemetery.

Sources

External links

 

1790s births
1865 deaths
Burials at Mount Hope Cemetery (Rochester)
Mayors of Rochester, New York
Whig Party members of the United States House of Representatives from New York (state)
19th-century American politicians